Agrippina de la Cruz (born 7 November 1960) is a Filipino hurdler. She competed in the women's 100 metres hurdles at the 1988 Summer Olympics.

References

1960 births
Living people
Athletes (track and field) at the 1984 Summer Olympics
Athletes (track and field) at the 1988 Summer Olympics
Filipino female hurdlers
Olympic track and field athletes of the Philippines
Place of birth missing (living people)